Aimeric de Belenoi (fl. 1215–1242) was a Gascon troubadour. At least fifteen of his songs survived. Seven others were attributed to him in some medieval manuscripts.

Early life 
Aimeric was born in the castle of Lesparra in the Bordelais (metropolis civitas Burdigalensium, the modern Gironde). His uncle was another troubadour, Peire de Corbiac. His vida says he was a cleric and later a jongleur before he took to "inventing good songs, which were beautiful and charming." He apparently was the feudal lord of Belenoi, an unknown location.

Career 
The chief object of his songs was a lady named Gentil de Rieux (Gentilis de Gienciaco), a Gascon from Gensac-Saint-Julien and the wife of Raimon de Benque. His biographer records that he lingered in Gascony a long time "for her" before moving on to Catalonia, where he died.

Aimeric's poetry refers to events at Toulouse, Provence, and Italy, implying that he travelled. He was at the Este court in Ferrara in the 1210s, where he probably had contact with Aimeric de Pegulhan, Albertet de Sestaro, Guillem Augier Novella and Peirol. He may also have made the acquaintance of Peire Cardenal.

Aimeric went to Castile before making his final trip to Catalonia. His last datable work was Nulhs hom en res no falh, a planh for Nuño Sánchez, who died in 1242. This planh was addressed to the comtessa Beatris, wife of Raymond Berengar IV of Provence, and senher N'Imo, her brother Aimone, son of Thomas I of Savoy. Though the work is often ascribed to Raimbaut de Vaqueiras in the chansonniers, the reference to this pair and the style of the work, favour ascription to Aimeric. It is the only piece of work by Aimeric which survives with a melody, though that melody is ascribed (with the lyrics) in its lone manuscript to Peirol. The melody is through-composed.

Aimeric's verses were first collected by Maria Dumitrescu as Poésies du troubadour Aimeric de Belenoi and published at Paris in 1935. She criticised his work as "banal", but it enjoyed widespread popularity in the High Middle Ages, especially in Italy, and it is varied in its intertwining themes moral, religious, and amorous.

Works
All twenty two works that are sometime attributed to Aimeric are listed below, alphabetically:

Sources

Egan, Margarita, ed. and trans. The Vidas of the Troubadours. New York: Garland, 1984. .
Gaunt, Simon, and Kay, Sarah (edd.) The Troubadours: An Introduction. Cambridge: Cambridge University Press, 1999. .

External links
Complete works of Aimeric de Belenoi

Notes

Gascons
13th-century French troubadours
People from Gironde
1215 births
1242 deaths